"You Got What It Takes" is a 1959 single by Marv Johnson. In the US it reached number 2 on the Black Singles chart, and number 10 on the Billboard Hot 100 early in 1960.  In the UK Singles Chart it reached a high of number 5. The original recording of "You Got What It Takes" was by Bobby Parker on Vee-Jay 279 in 1958. Parker claims to have written the song, and his name is on the 1958 recording, but later versions credit Berry Gordy, Gwen Gordy, Billy Davis, and sometimes Marv Johnson.

Other notable recordings
 A 1967 cover of the song by The Dave Clark Five reached number 7 in the United States and number 28 in the UK.
 A rock and roll cover by Showaddywaddy reached number 2 in the UK in 1977.

References

External links 
 List of cover versions of "You Got What It Takes" at SecondHandSongs.com

1959 singles
1960 singles
1967 singles
Marv Johnson songs
Songs written by Berry Gordy
Songs written by Billy Davis (songwriter)
Songs written by Gwen Gordy Fuqua
Song recordings produced by Berry Gordy
1959 songs
United Artists Records singles
Showaddywaddy songs
1977 singles
The Dave Clark Five songs